Nomada wickwari, is a species of bee belonging to the family Apidae subfamily Nomadinae. It is endemic to Sri Lanka.

References

External links
 http://animaldiversity.org/accounts/Nomada_wickwari/classification/
 https://www.academia.edu/7390502/AN_UPDATED_CHECKLIST_OF_BEES_OF_SRI_LANKA_WITH_NEW_RECORDS
 http://www.atlashymenoptera.net/biblio/Karunaratne_et_al_2006_Sri_Lanka.pdf

Nomadinae
Insects described in 1913